Marvie Elton Georges  (1 May 1943 – 5 April 2018) was a British Virgin Islander politician and businessman.  Georges served in a number of public offices, but most notably as the Deputy Governor of the British Virgin Islands from 1983 to 2003, and then again more briefly from 2007 to 2008.

He also served as the Complaints Commissioner of the British Virgin Islands from 2009 to 2015.  He has also been recognised as one of the founding figures in relation to the Territory's Department of Disaster Management in the 1970s.  As a senior public figure, Georges often spoke out in relation to sensitive political issues.

He served as Chairman of the BVI's Health and Wellness Advisory Council.

In business, he was a director of Seven Seas Water, a division of AquaVenture Holdings.  He also acted as a mediator and consultant.

Personal life

Georges received his undergraduate degree from Mount Allison University in mathematics, and a postgraduate diploma in public administration from Carleton University.

He was an active member and lay preacher of the British Virgin Islands Methodist church.

He was married.

Chess player

Elton Georges played for British Virgin Islands in the three Chess Olympiads in row (1976-1980).

Death

Georges died on 4 April 2018 after a short illness.

Political offices

External links

References

1943 births
2018 deaths
Deputy Governors of the British Virgin Islands
British Virgin Islands politicians
Carleton University alumni
Mount Allison University alumni
People from Road Town
Officers of the Order of the British Empire